The 2018 Hastings Borough Council election took place on 3 May 2018 to elect members of Hastings Borough Council in England. This was on the same day as other local elections. Every seat on the council was up for election following boundary changes. Labour retained their majority.

Election result

Ward results

Ashdown

Baird

Braybrooke

Castle

Central St Leonard's

Conquest

Gensing

Hollington

Maze Hill

Old Hastings

Ore

Silverhill

St Helen's

Tressell

West St Leonard's

Wishing Tree

References

Hastings
2018
2010s in East Sussex